Nuno Mendes (born 1973) is a London-based Portuguese chef, former executive chef at Chiltern Firehouse, London.

Early life
Nuno Mendes was born and raised in Lisbon.

Career
Mendes was trained at the California Culinary Academy in the 1990s, worked at elBulli, and has worked with Wolfgang Puck, Rocco di Spirito, and Jean-Georges Vongerichten. In 2006, Mendes opened Bacchus, a gastropub in Hoxton, and later opened The Loft Project, from his own apartment in Shoreditch, "where some of the best chefs cooked in front of guests, offering a pioneering and intimate experience".

In 2010, Mendes opened Viajante (Portuguese for "traveller") in Bethnal Green’s Town Hall Hotel, inspired by world cuisines. In its first year  it received a Michelin star and was included in the 2013 World's 50 Best Restaurants. One critic said of the restaurant, "Nuno Mendes has brought a taste of El Bulli to the East End". Giles Coren of The Times referred to Mendes as "every restaurant critic's secret favourite cook".

In March 2022, Mendes opened a Portuguese restaurant, Lisboeta on Charlotte Street, London.

Personal life
Mendes has a daughter and twin sons, with his partner Clarise, a South African stylist.

References

1973 births
Living people
Portuguese chefs
People from Lisbon
California Culinary Academy alumni
English people of Portuguese descent